is a former Japanese football player.

Playing career
Fukasawa was educated at and played for Shizuoka Gakuen High School, where he led the varsity soccer team to the national championship in 1995. After graduating from high school, he entered professional football.

Fukasawa (in Japan, his name is listed with Fukazawa on J.League officials) played 20 games in J1 League, Yokohama F. Marinos and 134 games in J2 League Albirex Niigata.

In 1996, he played with River Plate in Argentina for a year on loan.  In 1999, he went on loan again to play with CD Tenerife in Spain for 6 months. In 2005, he moved to Canada to play for Montreal Impact in the United Soccer League and was named the club's newcomer of the year in his first season .

In 2007, he joined Bangkok University FC in Thailand and became the first Japanese footballer to play for a non-Japanese club in AFC Champions League. In 2008, he moved to Singapore's S.League side Singapore Armed Forces FC.

Presently he decided to come back to Thailand again and join with his former club Bangkok United FC (formerly name Bangkok University FC)"

Masahiro Fukasawa won the accolade as SAFFC’s Player of the Year at the Warriors Nite 2008, the Club’s annual Appreciation Dinner, held on 19 Nov 08 at the Civil Club @ Bukit Batok.

The Award marked a personal milestone for the Japanese who joined the Warriors only this year and capped it with a consistent and solid performance on the flanks and in central midfield. The versatile Japanese has been highly influential and effective, particularly in the final rundown to the Championship against title contenders, Home United and Super Reds. In early of 2012 he joined Bontang FC.

In 2013 he joined Nagaworld FC in the Cambodian League, where he served as captain. He stayed with the club for 3 years until moving to Angkor Tiger FC (then called "Cambodian Tiger FC") at the end of the 2016 season, where he was also given the captain's armband, succeeding fellow Japanese midfielder Masakazu Kihara.

He is one of the few Japanese players to play in 4 out of 6 Confederations.

Playing style
Small in size but speedy on and off the ball, originally debuted as a skillful shadow striker in J.League. He was converted into an attacking midfield while at Montreal and had sharp one-on-ones. In Singapore, with his ball skills, he was brought into the middle of the field as a holding midfield, and that is where he plays now in Cambodia.

Club statistics

Honours

Club

Albirex Niigata
J2 League: 2003

Singapore Armed Forces
S.League: 2008, 2009
Singapore Cup: 2008

Individual
Montreal Impact's Newcomer of the Year: 2005
SAFFC's Player of the Year: 2008
Bangkok united football club :  2010

References

External links

 

1977 births
Living people
Albirex Niigata players
Association football midfielders
Association football people from Shizuoka Prefecture
Masahiro Fukasawa
Expatriate footballers in Cambodia
Expatriate footballers in Singapore
Expatriate footballers in Thailand
Expatriate soccer players in Canada
J1 League players
J2 League players
Japanese expatriate footballers
Japanese expatriate sportspeople in Canada
Japanese expatriate sportspeople in Thailand
Japanese expatriate sportspeople in Singapore
Japanese expatriate sportspeople in Cambodia
Japanese footballers
Montreal Impact (1992–2011) players
Singapore Premier League players
Masahiro Fukasawa
USL First Division players
Warriors FC players
Yokohama F. Marinos players
Nagaworld FC players